Thomas Tesche (born 27 December 1978) is a retired German badminton player. He is the twin brother of Joachim Tesche, another former German badminton player. Thomas Tesche holds a degree in Business Administration from the University of Saarland in Saarbrücken, in business taxation, auditing and banking. Afterwards he completed his studies, he worked for 5 years as a research assistant at the Center for Accounting and Auditing at the University of Saarland in the area of accounting-related consultancy, as well as (co-)authoring numerous publications dealing with accounting issues.

Achievements

European Junior Championships
Boys' doubles

IBF/BWF International 
Men's doubles

References

External links 

1978 births
Living people
German male badminton players